Oensingen railway station is a railway station in the municipality of Oensingen, in the Swiss canton of Solothurn. The station is a keilbahnhof. It is also a terminus of the  gauge Langenthal–Oensingen line of Aare Seeland mobil.

Services
 the following services stop at Oensingen:

References

External links 
 
 

Railway stations in the canton of Solothurn
Swiss Federal Railways stations